The 2019 Russian Cup Final was the 27th Russian Cup Final, the final match of the 2018–19 Russian Cup. It was played at Samara Arena in Samara, Russia, on 22 May 2019, contested by Lokomotiv Moscow and Ural Yekaterinburg. Lokomotiv Moscow won the match 1–0, with the only goal coming from Dmitri Barinov in the 27th minute. Since Lokomotiv Moscow had already qualified for the 2019–20 UEFA Champions League, Arsenal Tula will enter the 2019–20 UEFA Europa League in the second qualifying round.

Route to the final

Lokomotiv Moscow

Ural Yekaterinburg

Pre-game

Match

Team selection

Details

Post-match

References

Russian Cup finals
Russian Cup
Cup
FC Lokomotiv Moscow matches
FC Ural Yekaterinburg matches